Read is a civil parish in Ribble Valley, Lancashire, England.  It contains seven listed buildings that are recorded in the National Heritage List for England.  Of these, one is at Grade II*, the middle grade, and the others are at Grade II, the lowest grade.  The most important building in the parish is the country house Read Hall; this and a number of structures in the grounds are listed.  The other listed buildings are a church, a farmhouse, and a railway viaduct.

Key

Buildings

References

Citations

Sources

Lists of listed buildings in Lancashire
Buildings and structures in Ribble Valley